Jan Bula (24 July 1920 Lukov – 20 May 1952 Jihlava) was a Czech Roman Catholic priest and victim of the Czechoslovak Communist regime.

He was sentenced to death in one of the show trials of the Babice case and hanged. In 1990 he was posthumously rehabilitated.

The Catholic Church has been considering his beatification since 2004. The Roman Catholic Diocese of Brno is conducting the proceedings.

References

External links
 Information about beatification procedure

1920 births
1952 deaths
People from Třebíč District
20th-century Czech Roman Catholic priests
People executed by the Czechoslovak Socialist Republic by hanging
Executed Czechoslovak people
Executed Roman Catholic priests
Czechoslovak Roman Catholic priests
Venerated Catholics
20th-century Roman Catholic martyrs
20th-century venerated Christians
Executed Czech people